Cyril Theodore Anstruther Wilkinson CBE (4 October 1884 – 16 December 1970) was an English field hockey player who competed in the 1920 Summer Olympics for Great Britain. The team won the gold medal. He was also a cricketer, as well as Registrar of the Probate and Divorce Registry from 1936 to 1959.

Hockey
As well as appearing for Great Britain as a member of the gold medal winning team in the 1920 Olympics, he also represented and captained the England side. At club level, he played for Hampstead.

Cricket
He made his debut in first-class cricket for The Gentlemen of England in 1908. He subsequently played for Surrey between 1909 and 1920. He captained the side in 1914, when it won the County Championship, 1919 and 1920, though he had to miss a number of matches through business commitments.

He was a useful right-handed batsman who, in 54 first-class appearances, scored 1,773 runs at an average of 25.32, with 3 centuries and a highest score of 135. This innings was against Middlesex at The Oval, and it took him less than two hours. He was an occasional slow left-arm bowler, with 23 wickets to his credit at 31.47 and best innings figures of 6-43.

His last senior match (though not first-class) was a two-day fixture in 1928 in which he played for the Civil Service cricket team against the touring West Indians. Subsequently he was an enthusiastic club cricketer, He appeared every August for Sidmouth. In 1953, when aged 69, he scored 50 and took all ten wickets against the Nondescripts.

His father, Anthony Wilkinson, also played first-class cricket.

Outside sport
He was born at Elvet Hill, County Durham, England and was educated at Blundell's School.

During his time as Registrar of the Probate and Divorce Registry, he was joint editor of the Seventh Edition of William Rayden's Practice and law in the Divorce Division of the High Court of Justice and on appeal therefrom, published in 1958 by Butterworth. The volume runs to 1311 pages.  He was appointed as a Commander of The Most Excellent Order of the British Empire (CBE) in the 1954 Queen's Birthday Honours.

He died at Honiton, Devon, England.

References

External links
 
Hockey profile
CricketArchive profile
Cricinfo profile, including his obituary from the 1971 edition of Wisden Cricketers' Almanack
Olympic profile

1884 births
1970 deaths
Commanders of the Order of the British Empire
English male field hockey players
English Olympic medallists
Olympic field hockey players of Great Britain
Field hockey players at the 1920 Summer Olympics
Olympic gold medallists for Great Britain
English cricketers
Surrey cricketers
Surrey cricket captains
People educated at Blundell's School
Olympic medalists in field hockey
Gentlemen of England cricketers
Medalists at the 1920 Summer Olympics
20th-century English lawyers